Contexts: Understanding People in their Social Worlds is a quarterly peer-reviewed academic journal and an official publication of the American Sociological Association. It is designed to be a more accessible source of sociological ideas and research and has been inspired by the movement towards public sociology.

Sections of the Journal
 Backpage
 Books
 Culture
 Feature
 From the Editors
 In brief
 Q&A
 Teaching and Learning
 Trends
 Viewpoints

History
Fischer was succeeded by Jeff Goodwin and James M. Jasper, who edited the journal from 2005 to 2007, injecting a certain amount of controversial humor such as New Yorker cartoons and a column written by "Harry Green" (actually Jasper) called "The Fool." The current editors are Rashawn Ray (University of Maryland-College Park) and Fabio Rojas (Indiana University).

Former Editors
 2002: Claude Fischer
 2003: Fischer
 2004: Fischer
 2005: Jeff Goodwin, James M. Jasper
 2006: Goodwin, Jasper
 2007: Goodwin, Jasper
 2008: Doug Hartmann, Chris Uggen
 2009: Hartmann, Uggen
 2010: Hartmann, Uggen
 2011: Hartmann, Uggen
 2012: Jodi O'Brien, Arlene Stein
 2013: O'Brien, Stein
 2014: O'Brien, Stein
 2015: Philip N. Cohen, Syed Ali
 2016: Cohen, Ali
 2017: Cohen, Ali
 2018: Fabio Rojas, Rashawn Ray
 2019: Rojas, Ray
 2020: Rojas, Ray

Characteristics
The journal differs from a typical academic journal as it is targeted more toward students and the general public. It is used widely in courses,, and a selection of its premier articles is available in book format through The Contexts Reader, published by W. W. Norton & Company, now in its second edition.

The new editors have introduced a blog feature on the magazines website, Contexts.org.

New print issues are published quarterly in February (Winter), May (Spring), August (Summer) and November (Fall).

Awards
Contexts won the Best Journal Award in the Social Sciences (2003) by Professional and Scholarly Publishing Division of the Association of American Publishers.

Notable Articles and Interviews
One of the most notable articles in Contexts is Ann Morning's interview with Rachel Doležal. The interview has aired on many TV news networks, such as Fox News, BBC, and USA Today, over the possibility of a trans-racial identity.

The academic journal ranges in topics from social mobility, immigration, race, Donald Trump's potential border wall, and Buffy the Vampire Slayer.

One of the board members for Contexts, Tressie McMillan Cottom, appeared on The Daily Show with Trevor Noah to discuss the impact of for-profit higher education in the United States on disadvantaged students.

Abstracting and indexing 
Contexts is abstracted and indexed in SocINDEX and Sociological Abstracts.

References

External links

 

Publications established in 2002
Sociology journals
SAGE Publishing academic journals
Quarterly journals
English-language journals
2002 establishments in the United States
Science education
American Sociological Association academic journals